Upper Subansiri (Pron:/su:bənˈsɪɹi/) is an administrative district in the state of Arunachal Pradesh in India.

History
The district was formed when Subansiri district was bifurcated into Upper and Lower Subansiri districts in 1980.

Geography
The district headquarter is located at Daporijo. The important towns are Chetam, Giba, Taksing, Limeking, Nacho, Siyum, Payeng, Taliha, Gite Ripa, Gussar, Dumporijo, Daporijo, Maro, Baririjo and Puchigeku, each of which is the headquarters of a circle.

Transport
The  proposed Mago-Thingbu to Vijaynagar Arunachal Pradesh Frontier Highway along the McMahon Line, (will intersect with the proposed East-West Industrial Corridor Highway) and will pass through this district, alignment map of which can be seen here and here.

Economy
In 2006 the Indian government named Upper Subansiri one of the country's 250 most backward districts (out of a total of 640). It is the only district in Arunachal Pradesh currently receiving funds from the Backward Regions Grant Fund Programme (BRGF).

Divisions
There are four Arunachal Pradesh Legislative Assembly constituencies in this district: Nacho, Taliha, Daporijo and Dumporijo. All of these are part of Arunachal West Lok Sabha constituency.

Demographics
According to the 2011 census, Upper Subansiri district has a population of 83,448, roughly equal to the nation of Andorra. This gives it a ranking of 621st in India (out of a total of 640). Its population growth rate over the decade 2001–2011 was 50.34%. Upper Subansiri has a sex ratio of 982 females for every 1000 males, and a literacy rate of 63.96%. Scheduled Tribes make up 93.86% of the population.

At the time of the 2011 census, 69.17% of the population spoke Tagin, 14.30% Gallong, 9.30% Nyishi, 1.14% Bhojpuri and 1.05% Nepali as their first language.

Education
Jawahar Navodaya Vidyalaya, Megdong for Upper Subansiri district is located at a distance of about 10 km east from administrative headquarter Daporijo

Tourism 
Tourist sites in the area include:
 Aato Topo statue at Dumporijo; 
 Menga mandir: a cave mandir with a huge Shiva Linga inside. The cave has two caves within, which goes down about 8 meters.
 Jalang waterfall at Timba village 
 Keba Somara village where there is Yechung Gambung in the Subansiri river, which is believed to be linked to a cave/large crack in the mountain, 2 km away and has an associated history. 
 Lingpi ligne at Dupit village has a huge Shiva Linga shaped stone (Lingpi coming out from earth) which has a 
 Achin Muri is a historical place associated with the massacre of Indian Army in 1953
 Sher-e-Thappa statue commemorating an engagement with the Chinese for 72 hours in 1962 Indo-China war

Also, there is trekking from Siyum to Mechuka through the snow-laden Tikuk pass in the Tikuk mountain (during November). This trade route
was part of the established barter practice between Tibet and the 
tribes in the region during 20th C.

References

External links
Official site

 
Districts of Arunachal Pradesh
1987 establishments in Arunachal Pradesh